The  (KD, English: Commandant Service), or later  (English: Military patrol) was a special duty of the National People's Army of the GDR.

These units did not exist as separate units or as special units within certain troops. The  was formed similar to units performing guard duties, where individuals were selected from existing officers and enlisted ranks. The tasks of the units comprised mainly the same functions that are undertaken by the Feldjäger (military police) of the Bundeswehr today, so among other things marches accompanied by military columns, the military security service, guard duties in the military prisons, and courier services.

This particular form of the formation of the military police from members of regular units was the consequence of the negative experiences and criminal behavior of the Wehrmacht's Feldgendarmerie in World War II.

References

Bibliography
 
 

Military units and formations of the National People's Army
Types of military forces
Military police